"Shade" is a song by Australian alternative rock band Silverchair. It was released as the fourth single from their debut album, Frogstomp, in 1995. It was the group's only single not chosen to be on their compilation album The Best of Volume 1.

Soundscape Magazine writer Colm Browne wrote that the song has a "terrific sound that is extremely pleasing to listen to. The lyrics are very simple and short but they seem much more heartfelt and that they may relate to the band personally".

Track listing
Australian CD single (MATTCD014)
 "Shade"
 "Madman (Vocal Mix)"
 "Israel's Son (Live)"

Charts

References

1995 singles
Grunge songs
Silverchair songs
Songs written by Daniel Johns
Songs written by Ben Gillies
Song recordings produced by Kevin Shirley